USZ may refer to:

 Universitätsspital Zürich (University Hospital of Zürich), Switzerland
 University of Szeged, Hungary